Kowloon Bay Sports Ground is a multi-purpose sports ground situated in Kowloon Bay, Kowloon, Hong Kong. 

The sports ground comprises an international standard 400-metres running track (8 lanes), an international standard natural turf pitch for ball games with floodlight system, a spectator stand with capacity of 1,450 people, A fee-paying carpark with 30 parking spaces for private car / van-type light goods vehicle and 5 parking spaces for motorcycle, a Fast Food Kiosk as well as electronic timing equipment.

Gallery

References

External links

 Leisure and Cultural Services Department - Kowloon Bay Sports Ground

Sports venues in Hong Kong
Football venues in Hong Kong
1987 establishments in Hong Kong
Kowloon Bay